Sir Ralph Warren (c. 1486 – 11 July 1553) was twice Lord Mayor of London, for the first time in 1536 and the second in 1543.

Biography
Ralph Warren was the son of Sir Thomas Warren of Feering, Essex, and grandson of William Warren.

Warren was a London mercer. He served as alderman, as Sheriff in 1528, and as Lord Mayor in 1536 and 1543. He was knighted in the first year of his mayoralty by Henry VIII.

He lived at Fulham House, a Grade II listed house at 87 Fulham High Street, Fulham.

In 1545 he gave a sword to the City of London, which could be the Pearl Sword that is now one of the five ceremonial City of London swords.

Warren died on 11 July 1553, and was buried in the chancel of the church of St. Osythe's, (also known as St Benet Sherehog).

Marriages and issue
Warren married firstly Christiana Warcup, widow of Roger North (d.1509), and daughter of Richard Warcup or Warcop of Sinnington, Yorkshire. By her marriage to Roger North, Christiana (née Warcup) had a son and daughter, Sir Edward North, and Joan North, who married, and was the Marian exile, Joan Wilkinson.

Warren married secondly, Joan Trelake, the daughter of John Trelake alias Davy, of Cornwall, by whom he had two children, Richard Warren (d.1598) and Joan Warren (d.1584), who married her father's ward, Sir Henry Williams of Hinchingbrooke House, Huntingdonshire, grandfather of the Protector Oliver Cromwell.

Joan married secondly, on 25 November 1558, Sir Thomas White, alderman of London, founder of St John's College, Oxford.

See also
 List of Sheriffs of the City of London
 List of Lord Mayors of London

Notes

References

Attribution

1480s births
1553 deaths
Year of birth uncertain
Sheriffs of the City of London

16th-century lord mayors of London
People from Fulham
15th-century English people
16th-century English businesspeople
Merchants of the Staple
Knights Bachelor